Reflec Beat Volzza (stylized as REFLEC BEAT VOLZZA) is the fifth installment of the touch-screen based music video game, Reflec Beat series. It was announced on August 26, 2015 as the sequel of Reflec Beat Groovin'!! with location testing period beginning from August 28 to 30, 2015. It was released on October 28, 2015.

Gameplay 

As with previous games, Reflec Beat Volzza employs an air-hockey play style in which players have to touch incoming objects, reflecting and bouncing them left and right to the opposite side. Different types of objects may appear, including the normal ones, objects that require players to hold them, and objects that move up and down instead of left and right. Higher difficulties also employ additional markers above the reflecting line where objects disappear when touched, instead of reflecting back. A new type of object, the Slide Object, requires players to touch and slide them, instead of merely touching or holding them.

Reflec Beat Volzza increases the difficulty scale from 10+ to 13 (12 prior from January 30, 2016); songs that previously employ a 10+ difficulty rating are all re-rated to 11 or 12. The maximum difficulty available for each round of a playthrough is also changed to 7 for Round 1, 9 for Round 2, and 12 for Final Round (as opposed to 8 for Round 1, 10 for Round 2, and 10+ for Final Round used in previous games).

Music

Reflec Beat Volzza

Reflec Beat Volzza 2

References

External links 
 Official site
 REFLEC BEAT Volzza on Bemaniwiki

Bemani games
2015 video games
Arcade video games
Arcade-only video games
Video games developed in Japan